20th Street may refer to:

 20th Street (BMT Fifth Avenue Line), a defunct New York City Subway station
 Right Of Way/20th Street station, on the San Francisco Municipal Railway light rail network's J Church line
 20th Street station (Muni Metro), a light rail stop on the Muni Metro T Third Street line in Dogpatch, San Francisco
 Twentieth Street Historic District, a California Registered Historic Place